This is a list of years in North Korea.

20th century

21st century

See also

List of years in South Korea
List of years by country
 Timeline of Korean history
North Korean calendar

 
History of North Korea
North Korea-related lists
Korea North